Taray District is one of eight districts of the Calca Province in the Cusco Region in Peru. Its seat is Taray. The town lies near Pisac, southwest of it, at a stream called Pawayuq (Pahuayoc), an affluent of Willkanuta River.

Geography 
Some of the highest mountains of the district are listed below:

 Hatun Pukara
 Inti Qaqa
 Ñust'apata
 Pata Q'asa
 Pillku Urqu
 Silla Q'asa
 Wanakawri
 Yana Qaqa

Ethnic groups 
The people in the district are mainly indigenous citizens of Quechua descent. Quechua is the language which the majority of the population (86.14%) learnt to speak in childhood, 13.37% of the residents started speaking using the Spanish language (2007 Peru Census).

See also 
 Mawk'ataray

References